Li Shui-po (born 1955/1956) is a Taiwanese businessman and billionaire who founded the stainless steel product manufacturer Kinglai Hygienic Materials.

Biography
Li founded Kinglai in 1991 and relocated its headquarters to Kunshan, Jiangsu, China in 2000. In 2011, the company went public on the Shenzhen Stock Exchange.

Personal life
He is married and lives in Kunshan, China.

Net worth
Forbes lists his net worth as of April 2022 at $1.1 billion USD.

References 

Taiwanese billionaires
Taiwanese company founders
20th-century Taiwanese businesspeople
21st-century Taiwanese businesspeople
Living people
1950s births